François (Sunny) Duval is a Québécois rock guitarist and songwriter. He has been associated with the band Les Breastfeeders. He has also performed as "Pierre Rival" in the duo Les Freres Rivaux with Damien Robitaille ("Michel Rival").

Under his own name he has produced four albums.  His 2010 album Sein Noir, Sein Blanc won the award for best rock and roll album at the 2010 GAMIQ (Gala Alternatif de la Musique Indépendante du Québec) Awards.

Discography

Albums
Achigan (2005)
Sein Noir, Sein Blanc (2010) 
Amour d'amour (2013)
New wave de plage (2016)

References

Living people
Canadian rock guitarists
Canadian male guitarists
Canadian rock singers
Canadian male singers
Canadian songwriters
French-language singers of Canada
Musicians from Montreal
Songwriters from Quebec
Writers from Montreal
Year of birth missing (living people)